John David McEntee II (born May 9, 1990) is the founder and CEO of The Right Stuff, a dating app for conservatives. McEntee is also an American political advisor who served as  Director of the White House Presidential Personnel Office in the Trump Administration. McEntee began as a body man and personal aide to the president until he was dismissed by White House chief of staff John Kelly in March 2018. McEntee had failed a security clearance background check and was under investigation by the Homeland Security Department for possible financial crimes relating to gambling. After Kelly was dismissed in December 2018, Trump rehired McEntee and named him Director of the Office of Presidential Personnel in February 2020.

Early life, family and education 
McEntee was raised in a Roman Catholic family in Fullerton, California. His father is John D. McEntee, a producer/manager who books celebrities for private and corporate functions, as well as for resorts including the MGM Resorts, Caesars Palace, and Venetian Properties. His cousin, Zac McEntee, was the Deputy Chief of Staff for Treasury Secretary Steve Mnuchin.

He attended St. Angela Merici Parish School in Brea, California. Later, he attended Servite High School in Anaheim, where he played quarterback on the varsity football team. As a senior, he threw for 1,525 yards with seven touchdown passes and rushed for four touchdowns.

McEntee was a redshirt his first year at the University of Connecticut. Thereafter, he saw limited playing time in his first two full seasons of play. In 2011, he was the team's starting quarterback and played all 12 games in 2011, leading the team to a 5–7 season. As the team's quarterback, McEntee passed for over 150 yards in seven games, passed for over 200 in four games, and reached a season and career-high of 300 yards against Western Michigan University, where he also had a career high of four touchdown passes and 22 completions.  He finished the season throwing for 12 touchdowns with 8 interceptions. McEntee completed his communications degree in the spring of his senior year, but he was thereafter no longer the starting quarterback for his final season in 2012, playing sparingly in three games.

Career 
By 2015, McEntee worked as a production assistant for Fox News, focusing on the channel's social media accounts. He successfully lobbied for a job on the Trump campaign, joining as a volunteer in July of that year, later being promoted to a full-time position as trip director. McEntee was responsible for executing the campaign's rallies while traveling with the candidate and coordinating the campaign's travel for all staff.

After Trump won the 2016 election, McEntee was asked to join his staff as an aide, serving as his body man. McEntee accompanied President Trump on all trips, most notably the President's trip to Saudi Arabia in May 2017, where John McEntee "Man in red tie" and Ivanka Trump "#Trump's_daughter" were the most trending hashtags in the country.  

McEntee's service in the White House ended on March 13, 2018 when he was fired due to an "unspecified security issue" that was later revealed to be a problem with gambling debts and an inability to obtain a necessary security clearance. 

McEntee was immediately hired by Trump's 2020 reelection campaign as a senior adviser for campaign operations. In January 2020, McEntee returned to the White House where he shared some of his former "body man" duties with Nick Luna, the Director of Oval Office Operations. McEntee's role was director of the Office of Presidential Personnel, reporting directly to the President. He was tasked with identifying and removing political appointees and career officials deemed insufficiently loyal to the administration, despite having no previous personnel or people management experience. His reappointment was controversial given the circumstances of his dismissal.

On November 9th, 2021, John McEntee was issued a subpoena to testify by the House January 6th commission.

Jonathan Karl, the ABC News chief White House correspondent for the duration of the Trump administration, wrote a November 2021 profile of McEntee, characterizing him as particularly powerful because "Trump knew he was the one person willing to do anything Trump wanted." Karl observed that McEntee hired his young friends and, as one senior White House official said, "the most beautiful 21-year-old girls you could find," including Instagram influencers and a dance instructor. Karl characterized McEntee's power late in the Trump presidency:
McEntee and his enforcers made the disastrous last weeks of the Trump presidency possible. They backed the president’s manic drive to overturn the election, and helped set the stage for the January 6 assault on the Capitol. Thanks to them, in the end, the elusive “adults in the room”—those who might have been willing to confront the president or try to control his most destructive tendencies—were silenced or gone. But McEntee was there—bossing around Cabinet secretaries, decapitating the civilian leadership at the Pentagon, and forcing officials high and low to state their allegiance to Trump.

McEntee also sent a series of bullet points via text message to Pence's chief of staff to incorrectly assert that Thomas Jefferson "Used His Position as VP to Win" the 1801 election, which McEntee claimed "proves that the VP has, at a minimum, a substantial discretion to address issues with the electoral process."

In 2021, John McEntee met with Peter Thiel to pitch him on several tech startup ideas, one of which was the idea for a conservative dating app called The Right Stuff. Thiel agreed to fund The Right Stuff and subsequently made a seed round investment of $1.5 million. The Right Stuff is expected to launch at the end of September 2022.

In popular culture
In 2011, while he was a college football player, McEntee starred in a viral YouTube video that featured him throwing football trickshots. The video was later featured on CNN. Within 48 hours of posting, the video had generated nearly 7 million views and was featured on the homepage of Yahoo.

Personal life 

McEntee is Roman Catholic.

References

Living people
American Roman Catholics
UConn Huskies football players
Trump administration personnel
1990 births
Sportspeople from Fullerton, California
American football quarterbacks
Players of American football from California
The Right Stuff offices are located in Upper Montclair, NJ 07043.